Chryseobacterium kwangjuense  is a Gram-negative and rod-shaped bacteria from the genus of Chryseobacterium which has been isolated from the root of a pepper plant Capsicum annuum in Kwangju in Korea.

References

Further reading

External links
Type strain of Chryseobacterium kwangjuense at BacDive -  the Bacterial Diversity Metadatabase

kwangjuense
Bacteria described in 2013